"Dictadura" is a song by Puerto Rican rapper and singer Anuel AA and was released on October 28, 2021. It was released as the first single from his upcoming album Las Leyendas Nunca Mueren. The song debuted at number 13 in Spain and reached number 13 on the US Billboard Bubbling Under Hot 100.

Composition 
In the song, the singer name-drops several songs from fellow artists, such as Bad Bunny's "Amorfoda", Don Omar's "Danza Kuduro" and his ex Karol G's El Makinon.

Music video 
The video was released on October 28, 2021 and was directed by Anuel AA.

Charts

Certifications

References 

2021 singles
2021 songs
Anuel AA songs
Spanish-language songs